The Munda languages are a group of closely related languages spoken by about nine million people in the Indian subcontinent, spread across Central India, East India and Bangladesh. Historically, they have been called the Kolarian languages. They constitute a branch of the Austroasiatic language family, which means they are more distantly related to languages such as the Mon and Khmer languages, to Vietnamese, as well as to minority languages in Thailand and Laos and the minority Mangic languages of South China. Bhumij, Ho, Mundari, and Santali are notable Munda languages.

The family is generally divided into two branches: North Munda, spoken in the Chota Nagpur Plateau of Jharkhand, Chhattisgarh, Odisha, West Bengal and Bangladesh, and South Munda, spoken in central Odisha and along the border between Andhra Pradesh and Odisha.

North Munda, of which Santali is the most widely spoken and recognized as an official language in India, has twice as many speakers as South Munda. After Santali, the Mundari and Ho languages rank next in number of speakers, followed by Korku and Sora. The remaining Munda languages are spoken by small, isolated groups,  and are poorly described.

Characteristics of the Munda languages include three grammatical numbers (singular, dual and plural), two genders (animate and inanimate), a distinction between inclusive and exclusive first person plural pronouns, the use of suffixes or auxiliaries to indicate tense, and partial, total, and complex reduplication, as well as switch-reference. The Munda languages are also polysynthetic and agglutinating.

In Munda sound systems, consonant sequences are infrequent except in the middle of a word. Other than in Korku, whose syllables show a distinction between high and low tone, accent is predictable in the Munda languages.

Origin

Most linguists, including Paul Sidwell (2018), suggest that the Proto-Munda language probably split from proto-Austroasiatic somewhere in Indochina and arrived on the coast of modern-day Odisha about 4000–3500 years ago and spread after the Indo-Aryan migration to the region.

Rau and Sidwell (2019), along with Blench (2019), suggest that pre-Proto-Munda had arrived in the Mahanadi River Delta around 1,500 BCE from Southeast Asia via a maritime route, rather than overland. The Munda languages then subsequently spread up the Mahanadi watershed. 2021 studies suggest that Munda languages spread as far as Eastern Uttar Pradesh and impacted Eastern Indo-Aryan languages.

Classification
Munda consists of five uncontroversial branches (Korku as an isolate, Remo, Savara, Kherwar, and Kharia-Juang). However, their interrelationship is debated.

Diffloth (1974)
The bipartite Diffloth (1974) classification is widely cited:

North Munda
 Korku
Kherwarian
Kherwari branch: Birjia, Koraku
Mundari branch: Mundari, Bhumij, Asuri, Koda, Ho, Birhor, Kol, Turi
Santal branch: Santali, Mahali
South Munda
Kharia–Juang: Kharia, Juang
Koraput Munda
 Remo branch: Gata (Gta), Bondo (Remo), Bodo Gadaba (Gutob)
Savara branch [Sora–Juray–Gorum] : Parengi (Gorum), Sora (Savara), Juray, Lodhi

Diffloth (2005)
Diffloth (2005) retains Koraput (rejected by Anderson, below) but abandons South Munda and places Kharia–Juang with the northern languages:

Anderson (1999)
Gregory Anderson's 1999 proposal is as follows.

North Munda
Korku
Kherwarian: Santali, Mundari
South Munda (3 branches)
Kharia–Juang: Juang, Kharia
Sora–Gorum: Sora, Gorum
Gutob–Remo–Gtaʔ
Gutob–Remo: Gutob, Remo
Gtaʼ: Plains Gtaʔ, Hill Gtaʔ

However, in 2001, Anderson split Juang and Kharia apart from the Juang-Kharia branch and also excluded Gtaʔ from his former Gutob–Remo–Gtaʔ branch. Thus, his 2001 proposal includes 5 branches for South Munda.

Anderson (2001)
Anderson (2001) follows Diffloth (1974) apart from rejecting the validity of Koraput. He proposes instead, on the basis of morphological comparisons, that Proto-South Munda split directly into Diffloth's three daughter groups, Kharia–Juang, Sora–Gorum (Savara), and Gutob–Remo–Gtaʼ (Remo).

His South Munda branch contains the following five branches, while the North Munda branch is the same as those of Diffloth (1974) and Anderson (1999).

Note: "↔" = shares certain innovative isoglosses (structural, lexical). In Austronesian and Papuan linguistics, this has been called a "linkage" by Malcolm Ross.

Sidwell (2015)
Paul Sidwell (2015:197) considers Munda to consist of 6 coordinate branches, and does not accept South Munda as a unified subgroup.
North Munda
Korku
Santali, Munda
Sora–Gorum
Juang
Kharia
Gutob–Remo
Gtaʼ

Distribution

Reconstruction

The proto-forms have been reconstructed by Sidwell & Rau (2015: 319, 340-363). Proto-Munda reconstruction has since been revised and improved by Rau (2019).

See also
 Nihali language
 Munda peoples

References

Notes

General references
 Diffloth, Gérard. 1974. "Austro-Asiatic Languages". Encyclopædia Britannica. pp 480–484.
 Diffloth, Gérard. 2005. "The contribution of linguistic palaeontology to the homeland of Austro-Asiatic". In: Sagart, Laurent, Roger Blench and Alicia Sanchez-Mazas (eds.). The Peopling of East Asia: Putting Together Archaeology, Linguistics and Genetics. RoutledgeCurzon. pp 79–82.

Further reading

 2006-a. Munda Languages. In E. K. Brown (ed.) Encyclopedia of Languages and Linguistics. Oxford: Elsevier Press.
 Zide, Norman H. and G. D. S. Anderson. 1999. The Proto-Munda Verb and Some Connections with Mon-Khmer. In P. Bhaskararao (ed.) Working Papers International Symposium on South Asian Languages Contact and Convergence, and Typology. Tokyo. pp. 401–21.
 Zide, Norman H. and Gregory D. S. Anderson. 2001. The Proto-Munda Verb: Some Connections with Mon-Khmer. In K. V. Subbarao and P. Bhaskararao (eds.) Yearbook of South-Asian Languages and Linguistics-2001. Delhi: Sage Publications. pp. 517–40.
 Gregory D. S. Anderson and John P. Boyle. 2002. Switch-Reference in South Munda. In Marlys A. Macken (ed.) Papers from the 10th Annual Meeting of the Southeast Asian Linguistics Society. Tempe, AZ: Arizona State University, South East Asian Studies Program, Monograph Series Press. pp. 39–54.
 Gregory D. S. Anderson and Norman H. Zide. 2001. Recent Advances in the Reconstruction of the Proto-Munda Verb. In L. Brinton (ed.) Historical Linguistics 1999. Amsterdam: Benjamins. pp. 13–30.

Historical migrations
Blench, Roger. 2019. The Munda maritime dispersal: when, where and what is the evidence?
Rau, Felix and Paul Sidwell 2019. "The Maritime Munda Hypothesis." ICAAL 8, Chiang Mai, Thailand, 29–31 August 2019. 
Rau, Felix and Paul Sidwell 2019. "The Maritime Munda Hypothesis." Journal of the Southeast Asian Linguistics Society 12.2 (2019): 31-53

External links

SEAlang Munda Languages Project
SEAlang Munda Etymological Dictionary
Munda Dictionaries Project (Kiel, Peterson)
Donegan & Stampe Munda site
Munda languages at Living Tongues
bibliography
The Ho language webpage by K. David Harrison, Swarthmore College
RWAAI (Repository and Workspace for Austroasiatic Intangible Heritage)
http://hdl.handle.net/10050/00-0000-0000-0003-66EE-3@view Munda languages in RWAAI Digital Archive